The Diocese of Boise is a Latin Church ecclesiastical territory or diocese of the Catholic Church in the northwestern U.S., encompassing the entire state of Idaho. It is led by Bishop Peter F. Christensen, whose seat is the Cathedral of St. John the Evangelist in Boise. The diocese is a suffragan diocese in the ecclesiastical province of the metropolitan Archdiocese of Portland.

History

Eighteenth and nineteenth century
The first Catholics to arrive in the territory that would eventually become the Diocese of Boise were French-Canadian fur trappers in the mid-eighteenth century. That remained the sole Catholic contact in the area until 1815, when 19 Iroquois migrated into Idaho from eastern Canada. These Iroquois had the rudiments of Catholic belief, and apparently spoke of the need for "black robes" to show the way to heaven. Thereafter, for the next twenty-five years, members of the Nez Perce and Flathead tribes made four journeys to St. Louis, Missouri, attempting to recruit a priest for their communities. Their efforts bore fruit when, in 1840, Father Pierre-Jean De Smet, S.J., a Belgian missionary, was appointed to minister to them. The first recorded Mass in Idaho was thus celebrated by Fr. De Smet on 22 July 1840 at Henry's Lake.

Fr. De Smet's Jesuit order constructed the first Catholic church in Idaho, built in 1843 along the St. Joe River (near the present-day town of St. Maries) under the leadership of Father Nicholas Point, S.J.. The mission was later moved to banks of the Coeur d'Alene River. The church, named after the Sacred Heart, is most commonly known as the Cataldo Mission. It is the oldest building in Idaho.

Until 1862, Catholicism in Idaho remained limited to the tribes of Native Americans in north. However, a gold rush began in 1862 that brought tens of thousands of people to the Boise basin, including a large number of Irish Catholics. President Abraham Lincoln created the Territory of Idaho in 1863, and Pope Pius IX followed up five years later in 1868 by declaring Idaho an apostolic vicariate. At that time, both the territory and the apostolic vicariate included the current state of Idaho and the western portions of Montana and Wyoming.

Louis Aloysius Lootens, a native of Belgium a priest of the Archdiocese of San Francisco, was named the first Vicar Apostolic of Idaho, being consecrated as such in the old St. Mary's Cathedral on August 9, 1868 by Archbishop Joseph S. Alemany. At the time, the population of Idaho consisted of approximately 20,000 people, of whom only 1,500 were Catholic. Shortly after his appointment, Bishop Lootens was called to Rome to participate in the First Vatican Council. When he returned to Idaho, he found that the gold rush had ended, leaving only scattered ghost towns in its wake. Lootens submitted his resignation, and moved to Victoria, British Columbia, where he died on January 12, 1898.

Eight years after Lootens' resignation, on 7 October 1887, a new vicar apostolic Alphonse Joseph Glorieux was appointed by Pope Leo XIII. Glorieux, a native of Belgium and an alumnus of the American College of the Immaculate Conception there, was consecrated bishop by Cardinal James Gibbons while attending the Third Council of Baltimore on 19 April 1885 in the Cathedral of the Assumption (Basilica of the National Shrine of the Assumption of the Blessed Virgin Mary). The bishop made Boise his see, and established St. John the Evangelist parish as the cathedral. On the 25 August 1893, Pope Leo XIII established Boise as a diocese and appointed Glorieux as its first bishop.

Twentieth century
The opening of large tracts of land to settlement and the arrival of the railroad greatly increased the population of Idaho. When the diocese was officially established in 1893, there were approximately 7,000 Catholics in the state. It grew dramatically over the following century. One group of significance are the Basque people, who began immigrating to Idaho early in the twentieth century and primarily worked within the sheep industry. (Approximately 15,000 of their descendants remain in the diocese today.)

Succeeding Glorieux as bishop in 1918 was Monsignor Daniel Mary Gorman selected by Pope Benedict XV. Gorman was a priest of the Archdiocese of Dubuque, Iowa. He oversaw large growth within the diocese during his nine years as bishop, adding 32 diocesan priests, completing construction on the cathedral, and doubling enrollment in parish schools.

The third bishop of Boise was Edward Joseph Kelly, a native of The Dalles, Oregon and priest of the Diocese of Baker City. Kelly was selected by Pope Pius XI. Consecrated as bishop in 1928, Bishop Kelly served for 28 years until his death in 1956; the state's only Catholic high school bears his name (Bishop Kelly High School).

On the death of Kelly, Pope Pius XII gave the See of Boise to James J. Byrne, who was transferred to the Archdiocese of Dubuque in 1962.

The fifth bishop of Boise, Sylvester W. Treinen, a priest of the Diocese of Bismarck, chosen by Pope John XXIII. Treinen was consecrated on July 25, 1962. He promptly departed for Rome, where he attended three sessions of the Second Vatican Council. As bishop, he is remembered for implementing the decrees of that council. Treinen retired in 1988 and died in 1996, having served the diocese as a bishop (and bishop emeritus) for 34 years.

Pope John Paul II had Tod Brown installed as the sixth bishop of Boise on April 3, 1989. He became the Bishop of Orange in 1998.

On January 19, 1999, Michael P. Driscoll was appointed bishop by Pope John Paul II.

Beginning in the middle of the twentieth century, large numbers of migrant workers from Mexico arrived in the diocese. Some settled permanently in the region, while many others remained migratory and would return to Mexico after the harvest. Toward the latter part of the century, the number of immigrants from Mexico and other parts of Latin America increased dramatically, with the vast majority of them settling permanently in the southern part of the diocese. So many immigrants have now made Idaho their home that people of Latin American heritage now constitute well over half of the Catholics within the diocese.

The diocese today
Approximately 150,000 Catholics live within the Diocese of Boise, making them approximately 11% of the population of the state of Idaho. The diocese is divided up into six regions, called deaneries. In the whole of the diocese, there are 51 parishes, 31 stations, and 25 chapels. There are also five Catholic hospitals—namely Saint Alphonsus Regional Medical Center in Boise, Mercy Medical Center in Nampa, St. Joseph Regional Medical Center in Lewiston, St. Mary Hospital in Cottonwood, and St. Benedict Medical Center in Jerome — 13 elementary schools, and one high school--Bishop Kelly in Boise.

As of November 2014, the diocese has two vicars general, Very Reverend Dennis Wassmuth (Vicar General for Finance), and Very Reverend Joseph daSilva (Vicar General for the Clergy and Parishes). The chancellor is Mark Raper, who also serves as the Director of the Diocesan Canonical Office.

On November 4, 2014, Pope Francis appointed Peter F. Christensen as the eighth bishop of Boise. He was installed on December 17, 2014 at St. John Cathedral in Boise, Idaho.

Sexual abuse
In 1985, Diocese priest Mel Baltazar was sentenced to 7 years in prison after being convicted of molesting children as early as 1966. The presiding judge also stated that the Catholic Church protected Baltazar while he served in various positions throughout the world.

On September 28, 2018, diocesan priest Rev. W. Thomas "Tom" Faucher pleaded guilty to possession of child pornography, distribution of child pornography, and possession of marijuana. Chatroom conversations revealed Faucher's intent to use marijuana to drug children and operate a child pornography ring that also involved the rapes of these children. Faucher had satanic interests and admitted to acts of blasphemy and desecration. Diocesan officials said they would seek to have Faucher dismissed from the clerical state by the Holy See. In December 2018, Faucher was sentenced to 25 years in prison. The Diocese of Boise had Faucher evicted from his house while he was being held in county jail, and performed an exorcism on the property before putting it up for sale. On October 30, 2020, Faucher died in prison.

Bishops

Apostolic Vicars of Idaho
 Louis Aloysius Lootens (1868–1876), appointed Auxiliary Bishop of Vancouver Island
 Alphonse Joseph Glorieux (1885–1893), appointed Bishop of Boise upon erection of diocese

Bishops of Boise
 Alphonse Joseph Glorieux (1893–1917)
 Daniel Mary Gorman (1918–1927)
 Edward James Kelly (1927–1956)
 James Joseph Byrne (1956–1962), appointed Archbishop of Dubuque
 Sylvester William Treinen (1962–1988)
 Tod David Brown (1988–1998), appointed Bishop of Orange
 Michael Patrick Driscoll (1999–2014)
 Peter F. Christensen (2014–present)

Other priest of this diocese who became a bishop
William Keith Weigand, appointed Bishop of Salt Lake City in 1980 and later Bishop of Sacramento

See also

 Catholic Church by country
 Catholic Church in the United States
 Ecclesiastical Province of Portland in Oregon
 Global organisation of the Catholic Church
 List of Roman Catholic archdioceses (by country and continent)
 List of Roman Catholic dioceses (alphabetical) (including archdioceses)
 List of Roman Catholic dioceses (structured view) (including archdioceses)
 List of the Catholic dioceses of the United States

References

Bradley, Cyprian and Kelly, Edward J., History of the Diocese of Boise 1863-1952, Caldwell, Idaho: The Caxton Printers, Ltd., 1953.

External links
 Roman Catholic Diocese of Boise Official Site

 
1893 establishments in Idaho
Boise
Diocese of Boise
Boise
Boise